Mariash is a surname. Notable people with the surname include:

Ruta Šaca-Marjaša (Ruta Mariash, 1927–2016),  Lithuanian politician, lawyer, writer, and poet
Max Mariash, an American percussionist from the Art Van Damme Quintet

See also
Marijaš, a mountain peak in Kosovo